Lee So-young (born ) is a South Korean volleyball player. She is part of the South Korea women's national volleyball team at the 2020 Summer Olympics. The team finished at fourth place in 2020.

She participated in the 2014 FIVB Volleyball World Grand Prix.
On club level she was rostered to GS Caltex in 2012, before signing for Daejeon KGC in 2021.

Education
Jeonju Geunyoung Girls High School
Jeonju Keunyoung Middle School

International career

National Team 
Summer Olympics
2020 – 4th Place
FIVB World Championship
2018 - 17th Place
FIVB World Cup
2019 – 6th 
FIVB Volleyball Nations League
2019 – 15th Place
2021 – 15th Place
Asian Championship
2019 –  3rd
U23 Asian Championship
2015 –  3rd

Awards
2014 KOVO Cup – "Most Important Player"
2015 U23 Asian Championship – "Best Outside Spiker"
2018 KOVO Cup – "Most Important Player"2018–19 Korean V-League – "MVP of the Round" (Round 1)2020–21 Korean V-League – "MVP of the Round" (Round 5)2020-21 Korean V-League - "Best Outside Spiker"2020–21 Korean V-League Finals – "Most Valuable Player"Filmography
TV Show
 Running Man – (guest, 572)

References

External links
 Profile at FIVB.org''

1994 births
Living people
South Korean women's volleyball players
Place of birth missing (living people)
GS Caltex Seoul KIXX players
Volleyball players at the 2020 Summer Olympics
Olympic volleyball players of South Korea
People from Asan
Sportspeople from South Chungcheong Province